Raghavendra Tirtha (1595 – 1671) was a Hindu scholar, theologian and saint. He was also known as Sudha Parimalacharya. His diverse oeuvre include commentaries on the works of Madhva, Jayatirtha and Vyasatirtha, interpretation of the Principal Upanishads from the standpoint of Dvaita and a treatise on Purva Mimamsa. He served as the pontiff of matha at Kumbakonam from 1621 to 1671. Sri Raghavendra Swamy was also an accomplished player of the Veena and he composed several songs under the name of Venu Gopala. His shrine at Mantralayam attracts lakhs (hundreds of thousands) of visitors every year.

Biography
Sri Raghavendra Swami was born as Venkatanatha in the town of Bhuvanagiri, Tamil Nadu into a Deshastha Madhva Brahmin family of Gautama Gotra of musicians and scholars  after blessings from Lord Venkateshwara. His great-grandfather Krishna Bhatta was a tutor to the Vijayanagara king Krishnadeva Raya, his grandfather was Kanakachala Bhatta and his father Thimmanna Bhatta (also known as Thimmannacharya) was an accomplished scholar and musician. After the fall of the Vijayanagara empire, Thimmanacharya migrated to Kanchi with his wife Gopikamba. Venkatanatha had two siblings—Gururaja and Venkatamba. Venkatanatha's education was taken care of by his brother-in-law Lakshmi Narasimhacharya at Madurai after the early demise of his father, and he subsequently got married.

In 1624, Raghavendra Tirtha became peetadhipathi of Kumbhakona Matha, which is now known by the name of Raghavendra Matha. After a short stay at Kumbakonam, he went on a pilgrimage to Rameshwaram, Ramnad, Srirangam, and Mathura. Later, he moved westwards to Udupi and Subramanya, and then to Pandharpur, Kolhapur and Bijapur. At Kolhapur, he is said to have stayed for a long time and at Bijapur, he supposedly defeated many Advaitins and converted them to Dvaita fold. After that, he returned  to Kumbakonam. By 1663 he left for Mysore  where he got a grant from Dodda Devaraya Odeyar. Finally, he chose to settle down in Mantralayam

Raghavendra Swami took Samadhi in 1671 in Mantralayam, a village on the bank of river Tungabhadra in Adoni taluk in Andhra Pradesh.

Works
Forty works have been attributed to Sri Raghavendra swamy. Sharma notes that his works are characterised by their compactness, simplicity and their ability to explain the abstruse metaphysical concepts of Dvaita in understandable terms. His Tantradipika is an interpretation of the Brahma Sutra from the standpoint of Dvaita incorporating elements from Jayatirtha's Nyaya Sudha, Vyasatirtha's Tatparya Chandrika and the glosses by Vijayendra Tirtha.  Bhavadipa is a commentary on Jayatirtha's Tattva Prakasika which, apart from elucidating the concepts of the source text, criticises the allegations against Madhva raised by Appaya Dikshita and grammarian Bhattoji Dikshita. Sri Raghavendra swamy's expertise in Purva Mimamsa and Vyakarana is evident from his works on Vyasatirtha's Tatparya Chandrika, which runs up to 18,000 stanzas. He wrote a commentary on Nyaya Sudha titled Nyaya Sudha Parimala. Apart from these works, he has authored commentaries on the Upanishads, first three chapters of Rig Veda (called Mantramanjari) and Bhagvad Gita. As an independent treatise, he has authored a commentary on Jaimini Sutras called Bhatta Sangraha which seeks to interpret the Purva Mimamsa doctrines from a Dvaita perspective.

Conversation with Sir Thomas Munroe in 19th century
While Rayaru had his Brindavana Pravesha around 1:30 pm in the 17th century, it is recorded in the Gazette of then Madras Presidency that he gave darshan and spoke to Sir Thomas Munroe, a civil servant of British Government and discussed with him the restitution of the Inam Lands to the government which was being proposed then, meaning that Mantralaya would have become part of the restituted lands. After such a conversation, which Sir Thomas Munroe dutifully transcribed, the restitution was withdrawn.

In popular culture
Raghavendra Tirtha has been eulogised by Narayanacharya in his contemporaneous biography Raghavendra Vijaya and a hymn Raghavendra Stotra by Appannacharya. Outside the confines of Dvaita, he is regarded as a saint known for preaching the worship of Vishnu regardless of caste or creed. Hebbar notes "By virtue of his spiritual charisma, coupled with the innumerable miracles associated with him, the pontiff saint may very well be said to possess an independent and cosmopolitan cult of his own with his devotees hailing not only from all walks of life but from all castes, sects and even creeds as well". His humanitarianism is evident in the devotional poems composed in his honour by Vijaya Dasa, Gopala Dasa and Jagannatha Dasa. Raghavendra has also seen representation in the popular culture through Indian Cinema.

References

Bibliography

External links
Official website of Sri Raghavendra Swamy Mutt Mantralayam

Further reading
Raghavendra Vijaya: A Biography of Raghavendra Tirtha

1595 births
17th-century Hindu religious leaders
Madhva religious leaders
Dvaita Vedanta
People from Cuddalore district
Dvaitin philosophers
1671 deaths
Indian Hindu saints
Scholars from Tamil Nadu
17th-century Indian scholars